Mumbra [Urdu: ممبرا]  is a suburb of Thane district in Western India in the state of Maharashtra, Mumbai extension and within the Mumbai Metropolitan Region area with population of more than 12 lakhs. It is administered by Thane Municipal Corporation. Mumbra is mostly famous for its Bombay slang and the street foods and also famous for its mountainous views and waterfalls during monsoon.

History
Mumbra was a flourishing shipbuilding center in early times.

Much of the land around Mumbra was agricultural land until 1975. Between 1968 and 1975, Mumbai experienced significant population growth and greater population density. Then, about 1975, Mumbra's agricultural land was urbanized. This signaled an expansion of the greater Mumbai area, which realized significant population growth in the 1980s. Wafa Hill's "A, B, C" was one of the first planned Thane Municipal Corporation (TMC) approved buildings developed in the 1990s. Which lead the foundation for urbanization in Mumbra.

In 1991 there were about 44,000 people. After the riots of 1992 many Muslims fled Mumbai and settled in Mumbra; 10 Sq mile land was allotted by state Government under custody of state waqf board for resettlement of fled Muslims of different part of Mumbai. It is India's largest Muslim locality.

Demographics
The population of Mumbra is 12 lakhs in the Thane urban agglomeration. About 88% of Mumbra's residents are Muslim.Which makes Muslims as the Largest Religion in Mumbra. Religions according to percentage are given below

Transport
Bus service is available through the Thane Municipal Transport (TMT) and Navi Mumbai Municipal Transport (NMMT).

Rail service is available at the Mumbra railway station on Central line, also called as mainline.

The main source of Transport in Mumbra is Auto-Rickshaw. Mumbra didn't have any bus starting from Mumbra railway station and hence Auto-Rickshaws was the only possible conveyance.

But now, TMT Thane Municipal Transport runs bus service starting from Mumbra Railway Station to Bharat gears company.

State transport (MSRTC) operate regular bus service between Panvel, Bhiwandi, and Shil Phata.

Gallery
Mumbra is known for its green lavish mountains and waterfalls enhancing the beauty of the city.

References

External links

Cities and towns in Thane district
Suburbs of Mumbai